Son of the Morning Star is a 1991 American two-part Western television miniseries released by Chrysalis based on Evan S. Connell's best-selling 1984 book of the same name. It starred Gary Cole (George Armstrong Custer) and featured Dean Stockwell (General Philip Sheridan), Rosanna Arquette (Elizabeth Custer), Rodney A. Grant (Crazy Horse), Nick Ramus (Red Cloud), Buffy Sainte-Marie (voice of Kate Bighead), and Floyd Red Crow Westerman (Sitting Bull).

Plot
The film, in two parts, begins in 1876 when the Terry-Gibbon column relieves the remnants of the 7th Cavalry that had survived the Battle of the Little Bighorn. They discover Custer's Squadron has been annihilated, and the film 'flashes back' and tells Custer's story from the point of view/narrative of his wife, Elizabeth, beginning with the Kansas campaign of the mid-1860s.

Concurrently, the Indian perspective is told through the narrative of Kate Bighead, a young Cheyenne woman, who encountered Custer on several occasions. Kate Bighead's narrative is also used to describe events like the Fetterman Massacre and the Battle of Washita River, as is Elizabeth Custer's, to provide a balanced point of view.

Cast
 Gary Cole as Lt. Col. George Armstrong Custer
 Rosanna Arquette as Libby Custer
 Stanley Anderson as Ulysses S. Grant
 Edward Blatchford as Lt. Col. William W. Cooke
 George Dickerson as William Tecumseh Sherman
 Rodney A. Grant as Crazy Horse
 Tom O'Brien as  Charley Reynolds  
 Terry O'Quinn as Alfred Terry
 Nick Ramus as Red Cloud
 Tim Ransom as Thomas Custer 
 Robert Schenkkan as  Thomas Weir
 David Strathairn as Frederick William Benteen  
 Kimberly Guerrero as Kate Bighead   
 Buffy Sainte-Marie as Kate Bighead (voice)
 Demina Becker as young Kate Bighead  
 Dean Stockwell as General Philip Sheridan
 George K. Sullivan as General Winfield Scott Hancock
 Michael Medeiros as Major Marcus Reno  
 George American Horse as Stone Forehead 
 Floyd Red Crow Westerman as Sitting Bull
 Sheldon Peters Wolfchild as Bloody Knife  
 Rion Hunter as Sioux Interpreter
 Russ Walks as Autie Reed 
 Bryce Chamberlain as Parsons
 Peter Leitner as Dr. Coates
 Mike Casey as Charles Varnum  
 Sav Farrow as Giovanni Martinii
 Wendy Feder as Maggie Calhoun
 Patrick Johnston as Boston Custer
 Eric Lawson as Fred Gerard
 Jay Bernard as Congressman
 Mike Bacarella as Adjutant at Ft. Lincoln (uncredited)

Production
The release of the mini-series closely followed the theatrical release of Dances with Wolves. Although Kevin Costner was the first choice to play Custer, the role eventually went to Gary Cole. The movie was partially filmed on private property near the Little Bighorn National Monument in Montana near Billings, where a fort was built at a cost of $200,000. Filming also took place in South Dakota at Buffalo Gap and  Badlands National Park.  400 horses and 150 Native Americans were employed for the shoot. The 7th Cavalry consisted of 100 historical re-enactors who also doubled as technical advisers for the film.

Reception
Variety   praised the production as "a master work", with special mentions of quality in production, direction, cinematography and editing. New York magazine drew a comparison with the recently released Dances with Wolves, stating that Son of the Morning Star "deals in delusions instead of dreams".

The mini-series won four 1991 Emmy Awards for Outstanding Achievement In Costuming for a Miniseries or a Special, Outstanding Achievement In Makeup for a Miniseries or a Special, Outstanding Sound Editing for a Miniseries or a Special, and Outstanding Sound Mixing for a Drama Miniseries or a Special. It was also nominated for, but did not win, Outstanding Achievement in Hairstyling for a Miniseries or a Special.

References

External links
 

1991 television films
1991 films
1991 Western (genre) films
1990s American television miniseries
American Western (genre) films
American Indian Wars films
ABC Motion Pictures films
Cultural depictions of George Armstrong Custer
Cultural depictions of Sitting Bull
Cultural depictions of Crazy Horse
Cultural depictions of Ulysses S. Grant
Films about Native Americans
American films based on actual events
Films with screenplays by Melissa Mathison
Films directed by Mike Robe
Western (genre) cavalry films
1990s American films